Walter Schultz may refer to:

Walter Schultz (Gauleiter) (1874–1953), Nazi Party official and politician
Walter Schultz (theologist) (1900–1957), German theologian and Luthern bishop

See also
 Walter Schulz (disambiguation)